Banana Skin Shoes is the ninth studio album by Badly Drawn Boy, released on 22 May 2020. The track "Is This a Dream?" was released in January 2020. Gough called the song "a sound collage of chaos and confusion to reflect the ridiculous times we live in... A deliberately cartoonesque sonic poke in the eye, to those in whom we place trust, yet instead supply constant barrage of misinformation followed by bad decisions."

Critical reception

Banana Skin Shoes was met with "universal acclaim" reviews from critics. At Metacritic, which assigns a weighted average rating out of 100 to reviews from mainstream publications, this release received an average score of 81, based on 7 reviews.

Track listing
Track listing adapted from Tidal.

Charts

References

2020 albums
Badly Drawn Boy albums